The Dominican Army (is one of the three branches of the Armed Forces of the Dominican Republic, together with the Navy and the Air Force.

The Dominican army with 28,750 active duty personnel consists of six infantry brigades, a combat support brigade, a combat service support brigade and the air cavalry squadron.

History
Stationed near Santo Domingo, the first brigade has traditionally been the most powerful of the brigades, by virtue of its location and military resources. The First Brigade had five infantry battalions and a battalion of engineers. The Second Brigade and the Third Brigade are based at Santiago and Barahona, respectively. Their assets are spread throughout the country, and their units are mainly focused on local issues. The Fourth Brigade, also called Armed Forces Training Center (CEFA) because of their extensive training mission is at San Isidro, ten kilometers east of the capital. The Fourth Brigade controls the armored battalion and three infantry battalions. The Fourth Brigade also provided basic, advanced and specialized training. Also at San Isidro is the artillery battalion of the army, which was organized as a separate staff in order. Another independent and very powerful organization is the Combat Support Command, which includes the Presidential Guard Battalion and units of the military police, health and uniforms. Since 1989, assets include fourteen armored light tanks, twenty armored vehicles, and ten armored vehicles. The artillery is equipped with twenty-two 105mm Auril howitzers.

Organization

Under Army Headquarters 

Headquarters, Dominican Army in Comendador, Elías Piña Province

 1st Presidential Guards Regiment BRIGADIER A. DIAZ LUCIANO TEJEDA (Santo Domingo)
 Foot Guards Battalion
 Presidential Security Special Forces Battalion (Rapid Response) 
 2nd Honor Guard Regiment of the Ministry of Defence (Santo Domingo)
 Special Operations Brigade
 1st Special Forces Battalion
 2nd Special Operations Battalion
 6th Mountain Rifles Battalion (Constanza)
1st Air Cavalry Squadron "Major Aníbal Vallejo Pilot Sosa"  (La Isabela International Airport):
 2 Robinson R-44
 4 Robinson R-22
 5 Bell OH-58C
 3 Bell OH-58A +

Under the Operations Command 
1st Infantry Brigade - CG Santo Domingo
1st Infantry Battalion JUAN PABLO DUARTE (Com. And all elements at Camp August 16, Santo Domingo).
2 Infantry Battalion Francisco del Rosario Sánchez (Com. And all elements at Camp August 16, Santo Domingo).
3 Infantry Battalion MATIAS RAMON MELLA (Com. And all elements at Camp Ramon Mella, San Cristobal).
Reconnaissance and Security Company (Camp August 16, Santo Domingo) - equipped with soft skin vehicles, including SUVs.
Heavy Mortars battery (Camp August 16, Santo Domingo) - equipped with four M30 4.2 inch mortars.
1st Public Security Battalion (Urban Operations)

2nd Infantry Brigade - CG Santiago
5th Infantry Battalion (Com., Support Company Infantry Companies & 5, 6 & 7, all in Santiago.)
7 Infantry Battalion (Com, and Support Company Infantry Company 12 in San Francisco de Macorís,. Companies Infantry Cotuy 11, 13 & 14 in Nagua Samana).
8 Infantry Battalion (Com, and Support Company Infantry Company 8 in Puerto Plata, infantry companies Moca 9 & 10 in San José de las Matas).
Reconnaissance Platoon (Fortaleza Fernando Valerio, Santiago.) - Equipped with soft skin vehicles, including SUVs.
Howitzer Battery (Fortaleza Fernando Valerio, Santiago.) - Equipped with four M-101 105mm howitzers.
6th Battalion (in reserve)
7th Battalion (in reserve)
11th battalion (reserve)

3rd Infantry Brigade - CG San Juan de la Maguana
12 Infantry Battalion  (Com, and Support Company Infantry Company 22 at Azua).
Fortaleza March 19, headquarters of Infantry Battalion 12 Azua
13 Infantry Battalion (Com, and Support Company Infantry Company 23 at San Juan de la Maguana, 24 Infantry Company in Elias Pina).
14 Infantry Battalion  (Com and Support Company in Las Matas de Farfán,. Infantry Company 25 at Pedro Santana).
Reconnaissance Platoon - equipped with soft skin vehicles, including SUVs.
Heavy Mortars battery - ECIA equipped with four 120 mm Mortars.

4th Infantry Brigade - CG Mao
9 Macheteros Infantry Battalion  (Com. And all elements at Fte. November 19, Mao).
10 Infantry Battalion 10 (Com, and Support Company Infantry Company 16 at Dajabon, 15 Infantry Companies in Monte Cristi & Restoration 17).
11 Infantry Battalion (Com and Support Company in La Vega, 26 Infantry Company at Sabana Iglesia).
Reconnisance Platoon (Source November 19, Mao.) - Equipped with soft skin vehicles, including SUVs.
Heavy Mortars battery (Fte November 19, Mao.) - - ECIA equipped with four 120 mm mortars.

5th Infantry Brigade - CG Barahona
15 Infantry Battalion (Com and Support Company at Barahona,.  18 & 19 Infantry Companies at Jimani Neiba).
16 Infantry Battalion (Com, and Support Company Infantry Company 20 at Duvergé;. Infantry Company 21 at Pedernales).
Exploration Platoon - equipped with soft skin vehicles, including SUVs.
Heavy Mortars battery - ECIA equipped with four 120 mm mortars.

6th Infantry Brigade - CG San Pedro de Macoris
4 Infantry Battalion (Com & Support Company Infantry Company 1 at San Pedro de Macoris,. Infantry Company 2 at La Romana)
17 Infantry Battalion (Com & Support Company Infantry Company 4 at El Seybo;. Infantry Company 3 at Higuey)
Exploration Platoon - equipped with soft skin vehicles, including SUVs.
Heavy Mortars battery ECIA equipped with four 120 mm mortars.

Combat Support Brigade - CG Villa Mella, Santo Domingo
Armored Battalion (Com and all elements at Villa Mella.):
1st Squadron 12 M-41 light tank.
2nd Squadron 8 V-150 Commando AFVs. 4 currently with 1st Presidential Guard Regiment, 2 were transferred to Counter-Terrorist Group.
3rd Squadron 16 M3 A1 half-tracks.
Artillery Battalion (Com and all elements at Villa Mella.): 12 Reinosa 105mm / 26 120mm howitzers and 8 ECIA mortars
Engineer Battalion (Com and all elements at Santo Domingo).
Communications Battalion (Com and all elements at Santo Domingo).

Service Support Brigade - CG Santo Domingo
Service Support Battalion (Com and all elements at Santo Domingo.):
Quartermaster Company (Santo Domingo)
Medical Company (Santo Domingo)
Military Police Company (Santo Domingo)
Materiel and Equipment Maintenance Battalion (CG in Santo Domingo); which includes the Armeros Company at San Cristobal).
Transport Battalion (HQ and all elements at Santo Domingo).

GRADUATE SCHOOL OF MILITARY STUDIES, ERD.
Army Command and Staff College (based at San Isidro)

GENERAL MANAGEMENT TRAINING
Military School (based at San Isidro)
Army Training Battalion (based at Camp February 27 at Santo Domingo)

Equipment

Small arms
Note: This equipment is also used by the other branches of the Armed Forces, and the Counter-terrorism group.
Rifles:
Colt M16 rifle 5.56 mm 
Colt M4A1 5.56 mm 
AR-15 5.56 mm 
IMI Galil 5.56 mm 
Galatz 7.62 mm 
Heckler & Koch G3 7.62 mm 
Shotguns
Daewoo USAS-12 
Mossberg 500 
Franchi SPAS-15 
Sub-machine-guns
Heckler & Koch MP5 
FN P90 5.7×28 mm 
Uzi 
CZ Scorpion Evo 3 
Machine-guns
M-2 12.7 mm 
FN MAG 7.62 mm 
M-60A1 7.62 mm 
FN Minimi 5.56 mm 
M249 light machine gun 5.56 mm 
Hand-guns
Browning BDM 
Browning Hi-Power 
Taurus PT92 
Jericho 941

Mortars
M-29 81 mm  (104)
M1 81 mm 
M2 60 mm  
M-30 4.2 inch   (4)
ECIA 120 mm   (24)

Anti-armour weapons
Bofors m/45 105 mm  (28)
37 mm Gun M3; A/T guns  (3)
M40-A1C1 106mm recoilless rifle

Armoured vehicles
M41 Walker Bulldog 76mm Light tank  (Unknown quantity on active service)
Giat AMX-13 75mm Light tank  (2-15/ Retired)
V-150 Commando 4x4 AFV  (8 / At least 4 in use by the Presidential Guard.)
M3 Half Track APC  (16 / At least 5 active by 2016. Armed with one M-60, one Dual 0.50 Cal. and one 0.30 machine gun)
RM-79 APC 
RM-77 APC

Artillery
Reinosa howitzers 105mm/26 howitzers  (12)
M-101 105 mm howitzers  (4)
M3 105 mm howitzers  (N/A)

Anti-aircraft weapons
Bofors 40 mm 40mm Anti-Aircraft gun 
Hispano Suiza HSS 804 20mm Anti-Aircraft gun  (in use by the air force)

Motor vehicles 
 Humvee  (102)
 URO VAMTAC 1,500 kg 4×4  (60-80 total. 40–60 in 2000; 20 in 2001)
 Carolina Growler UV100DB 4×4, (2002) (rebuilt M151A2 ) UV100DB 4×4  (80)
 Carolina Wolverine Model 450 (4 × 4) (40 in 2002)
 Jeep J8 4x4 
 Nissan Patrol ML-6 4x4 
 Land Rover 4×4  (non-tactical roles)
 Polaris ATV 6x6  (several dozen)
 M35 2-1/2 ton cargo truck  (90)
 Pegaso 3055 6x6  (12)
 URO VAMTAC MT 15.14, MT 18.14 and MT 18.16  (80-100)
 Daihatsu Delta 4x4 trucks

Aircraft inventory
The Army operates 15 helicopters.

The Dominican Army Kiowas are equipped with FLIR cameras for night operations.

References

Sources
 Defense & Security Intelligence & Analysis: IHS Jane's | IHS
 Dominican Republic / Tables
 Latin American Light Weapons National Inventories 
 Dominican Republic Land Forces military equipment , armament and vehicles Dominican Army

External links
 Ejército Nacional (EN) 

Dominican Republic
Army
Military units and formations established in 1844